Thordisa lurca is a species of sea slug, a dorid nudibranch, shell-less marine opisthobranch gastropod molluscs in the family Discodorididae.

Distribution
This species was described from the Caribbean Sea. It has been reported from Brazil.

References

Discodorididae
Gastropods described in 1967
Taxa named by Eveline Du Bois-Reymond Marcus
Taxa named by Ernst Marcus (zoologist)